NFL Insiders was a National Football League studio show, that aired Monday through Friday at 3:00 p.m. ET on ESPN. The football-themed show replaced NFL 32 on August 5, 2013. The program was one of the only NFL-related studio programs to air during the week along with NFL Live.  On September 13, 2015, a new Sunday edition of NFL Insiders began airing on Sundays at 10:00 a.m. ET, replacing the first hour of Sunday NFL Countdown (which itself was shortened from 3 hours to 2 hours before it became a 3-hour show once again in 2017).

Personalities
 Suzy Kolber
 Wendi Nix
 Adam Schefter
 Chris Mortensen
 Matthew Berry
 Bill Polian
 Trey Wingo (Sunday host, 2015–2016)

Contributors
Regular contributors include:
 John Clayton - ESPN.com senior writer
 Ed Werder -  NFL insider
 Mel Kiper Jr. - NFL Draft expert
 Todd McShay - NFL Draft expert
 Jarrett Bell - USA Today Sports NFL columnist
 Adam Caplan - Sirius/XM Radio host
 Billy Devaney - former St. Louis Rams general manager
 Dan Graziano - ESPN NFL Insider
 Louis Riddick -  former NFL scout and director of player personnel
 Phil Savage - former Cleveland Browns general manager
 Field Yates - ESPN Fantasy Insider, who is in his 30s
 Mark Dominik - former Tampa Bay Buccaneers general manager
 Jim Trotter - ESPN.com senior NFL writer
 Andrew Brandt - NFL business analyst

Segments
Press Coverage: A segment that highlights tweets from sports reporters across the country.
Inside the Headlines: A segment that highlights and analyzes articles from newspapers across the country.
Insider's Notebook: Each insider highlights a player in the league.
Bill's Championship Indicators (BCI): A formula, developed by Bill Polian, consisting of the following team stats that would generally quantify a team as being a potential Super Bowl champion:
 Yards per pass attempt
 Points allowed per game
 Turnover margin
 Kicking efficiency
 3rd down efficiency on offense
 3rd down efficiency on defense
 QBR for the team
 QBR for the opposing team

See also
 NFL Live

References 

ESPN original programming
American sports television series
2013 American television series debuts
Insiders